The Burundian Basketball Championship (in French: Championnat National du Burundi), for sponsorship reason the Viva Basketball League, is a semi-professional basketball league that is the highest level of the sport in Burundi. The defending champion is New Star. The league is organised by the Fédération de Basketball du Burundi (FEBABU).

In 2022, the league signed a 4-year contract to be sponsored by the malt drink Viva; the winners of the league win a prize money of 10 million FBu (approximately $ 4,800).

Current teams
The following 10 teams played in the 2020 season.

Champions

Burundian national basketball championship

Viva Basketball League (2022–present)

In the Basketball Africa League

References

External links
FEBABU official Facebook

Basketball in Burundi
Basketball leagues in Africa
Sports leagues in Burundi